Roman Bagdasarovich Grigoryan (born 14 September 1982) is a former Russian professional footballer of Armenian descent.

Honours
 Russian Professional Football League Zone Center Top Goalscorer: 2015–16 (8 goals).

References

External links
 
 Profile at www.championat.ru

1982 births
Living people
Footballers from Moscow
Armenian footballers
Russian footballers
Association football midfielders
Russian sportspeople of Armenian descent
PFC Krylia Sovetov Samara players
FC Shinnik Yaroslavl players
Russian Premier League players
FC Vityaz Podolsk players
FC Armavir players
FC Moscow players
FC Tambov players
FC Neftekhimik Nizhnekamsk players
FC Novokuznetsk players